Cherry Street Historic District or variations with North or South may refer to:

 Cherry Street Historic District (Florence, Alabama), listed on the NRHP in Alabama
 Cherry Street Historic District (Helena-West Helena, Arkansas), listed on the NRHP in Arkansas
 South Cherry Street Historic District (Greenville, Kentucky), listed on the NRHP in Kentucky
 East Main Street-Cherry Street Historic District, Spencer, MA, listed on the NRHP in Massachusetts
 South Cherry Street Historic District (Vicksburg, Mississippi), listed on the NRHP in Mississippi
 Cherry Street Colonnades Historic District, Kansas City, MO, listed on the NRHP in Missouri
 North Cherry Street Historic District (Kernersville, North Carolina), listed on the NRHP in North Carolina
 North Cherry Street Historic District (Winston-Salem, North Carolina), listed on the NRHP in North Carolina